Enrique Moles Ormella (26 August 1883 – 30 March 1953) was a Spanish pharmacist, physicist, and chemist, most notable for his work on atomic weights of the elements. Enrique Moles is considered one of the foremost Spanish chemists of his time.

Life

Early life
Enrique Moles was born on 26 August 1883 in Vila de Gràcia near Barcelona to Pedro Moles Alrich and Maria Ormella Figuerola, both of which died while he was still infant.

Studies
Moles obtained the bachelor's degree from Colegio Iberico in Barcelona, and in 1900 he entered to study pharmacy at the Complutense University of Madrid. In 1906 he obtained the Doctor of Pharmacy. In 1909 Moles went to study in the University of Munich and in 1910 he attended the University of Leipzig to work on determination of atomic weights under Dr. K. Drucker. In 1916, Moles studied with Prof. Philippe A. Guye at the University of Geneva to establish the atomic weight of bromine, and he received the degree Doctor of Physics from the University of Geneva that year. In 1920, after combining all previous studies of chemistry (in Munich, Leipzig, and Zurich), Moles qualified for the third doctoral degree, Doctor of Chemistry. The title of his chemistry doctoral thesis was “Physico-chemical revision of the atomic weight of fluorine: contribution to the chemistry of this element”, and he formally received the degree from the University of Madrid only in 1926.

Career
Moles represented Spain in the 2nd General Conference of IUPAC (1921) and later served as the vice-president of IUPAC from 1934-1938. In 1949, Moles attended the meeting of the International Atomic Weight Commission as a prospective member and was elected the first Secretary of the Commission (the Secretary position was created during that meeting). Moles served as the secretary of the Commission until his death in 1953.

Civil war
The Spanish Civil War was a turning point in Moles' career. In 1936, he was a professor and vice-rector of the Complutense University of Madrid, department head of the National Institute of Physics and Chemistry, the Secretary of the Spanish Society of Physics and Chemistry, a member of the Spanish Royal Academy of Sciences. At the time of the outbreak, Moles took over the leadership of the National Institute of Physics and Chemistry (Blas Cabrera Felipe had moved to Paris), and in 1937 Moles was appointed Director of Explosives at this institution, which was now used for military purposes by the Republican government. In 1937, Moles was appointed Director of Explosives. In 1939 Moles fled to France where he signed the manifesto "Against the Fascist barbarity," published by El Socialista newspaper on the day after the aerial bombardment of Madrid. This made him the object of reprisals by the Nationalist government upon his return from France in December 1941. He was expelled from the University in January 1944, and joined the Instituto de Biología y Sueroterapia (IBYS) as technical advisor.

Honors
The Institute for Organometallic Chemistry of University of Oviedo was named after Enrique Moles in 1992.

Notes

References

1883 births
1953 deaths
Spanish physicists
Spanish chemists
People from Barcelona
Recipients of the Legion of Honour